Ned W. Wulk (August 14, 1920 – November 15, 2003) was an American basketball and baseball coach.  He served as the head men's basketball coach at Arizona State University from 1958 to 1982, compiling a record of 406–272. His 406 wins are the most of any head coach history of the Arizona State Sun Devils men's basketball program.  Wells Fargo Arena's basketball court was named after him in 1999.  At the time of his 400th victory, he was one of only four active coaches to win 400 or more games at one school. He led Arizona State to 17 winning seasons in his 25 years and a record of 39–15 against rival Arizona.

Early life and career
Wulk graduated from the La Crosse State Teachers College (now UW La Crosse) in 1942. There, he lettered in football, basketball, and baseball. After working as a high school physical education teacher for several years, he was hired by Xavier University in fall 1948 to serve as an assistant football coach, assistant basketball coach, and head baseball coach. He was promoted to head basketball coach after three seasons as an assistant.

Arizona State
Under Wulk, Arizona State reached 9 NCAA tournaments, and 3 Elite Eight appearances in 1961, 1963, and 1975. In the 1963 NCAA tournament at Provo, the Sun Devils routed UCLA in a second-round game, 93-79. The Bruins were on the brink of back-to-back national titles in ‘64 and ‘65. And in 1981, Wulk's ASU Sun Devils went to Corvallis on the final day of the regular season and defeated #1 ranked Oregon State by a score of 87-67. Wulk's 1963 team still has the school record for most wins in a season at 26. In the previous season, he set the ASU school record for longest winning streak at 18 games. He led the 1981 ASU Sun Devils of the Pac-10 to the highest national ranking in school history at #3, finishing with a record of 24-4. He was selected as the Pac-10 Coach of the Year in 1980, when ASU finished 21-6, including 15-3 in conference play.  He was fired in 1982 after one mediocre season.

Wulk was inducted into the Pac-10 Hall of Fame in 2003.

Head coaching record

Basketball

Baseball
Wulk spent eight seasons as Xavier's baseball coach.

References

1920 births
2003 deaths
American men's basketball coaches
American men's basketball players
Arizona State Sun Devils men's basketball coaches
Basketball coaches from Wisconsin
Basketball players from Wisconsin
College men's basketball head coaches in the United States
People from Marion, Wisconsin
Wisconsin–La Crosse Eagles baseball players
Wisconsin–La Crosse Eagles football players
Wisconsin–La Crosse Eagles men's basketball players
Xavier Musketeers baseball coaches
Xavier Musketeers men's basketball coaches